The Legislative Assembly of Roraima is the unicameral legislature of Roraima state in Brazil. It has 24 state deputies elected by proportional representation.

The first legislature began on January 1, 1991 and since then has 24 members.

External links
Official website

Roraima
Roraima
Boa Vista, Roraima
Raraima